A fiscal year (or financial year, or sometimes budget year) is used in government accounting, which varies between countries, and for budget purposes. It is also used for financial reporting by businesses and other organizations. Laws in many jurisdictions require company financial reports to be prepared and published on an annual basis but generally not the reporting period to align with the calendar year (1 January to 31 December). Taxation laws generally require accounting records to be maintained and taxes calculated on an annual basis, which usually corresponds to the fiscal year used for government purposes. The calculation of tax on an annual basis is especially relevant for direct taxes, such as income tax. Many annual government fees—such as council tax and license fees, are also levied on a fiscal year basis, but others are charged on an anniversary basis.

Some companies, such as Cisco Systems, end their fiscal year on the same day of the week each year: the day that is closest to a particular date (for example, the Friday closest to 31 December). Under such a system, some fiscal years have 52 weeks and others 53 weeks.

The calendar year is used as the fiscal year by about 65% of publicly-traded companies in the United States and for most large corporations in the United Kingdom. That is the case in many countries around the world with a few exceptions such as Australia, New Zealand, and Japan.

Many universities have a fiscal year which ends during the summer to align the fiscal year with the academic year (and, in some cases involving public universities, with the state government's fiscal year) and also because the university is normally less busy during the summer months. In the Northern Hemisphere, that is July to the next June. In the Southern Hemisphere, that is the calendar year, January to December. In a similar fashion, many nonprofit performing arts organizations will have a fiscal year which ends during the summer, so that their performance season that begins in the fall and ends in the spring will be within one fiscal year.

Some media/communication-based organizations use a broadcast calendar as the basis for their fiscal year.

Chart of various fiscal years

Tax year
The fiscal year for individuals and entities to report and pay income taxes is often known as the taxpayer's tax year or taxable year.  Taxpayers in many jurisdictions may choose their tax year. Some federal countries, such as Canada and Switzerland, require the provincial or cantonal tax year to align with the federal year. In the United States, most states retained a 30 June fiscal year-end date when the federal government switched to 30 September in 1976. Nearly all jurisdictions require that the tax year be 12 months or 52/53 weeks. However, short years are permitted as the first year or when changing tax years.

Most countries require all individuals to pay income tax based on the calendar year.  Significant exceptions include:
 Australia: individuals pay income tax based on the financial year of 1 July until 30 June.
United Kingdom: the tax year for individuals begins on 6 April. This is due to Britain historically having a calendar year starting on Lady Day (25 March) in the Julian calendar but a fiscal year ending on that day. When the UK adopted the Gregorian calendar in 1752, 25 March translated to 5 April and 26 March to 6 April. (See History of taxation in the United Kingdom#Why the United Kingdom income tax year begins on 6 April for more detailed explanation.)
United States: individuals may (but rarely do) elect any tax year, subject to IRS approval.

Many jurisdictions require that the tax year conform to the taxpayer's fiscal year for financial reporting. The United States is a notable exception: taxpayers may choose any tax year, but must keep books and records for such year.

Operation in various countries/region
In some jurisdictions, particularly those that permit tax consolidation, companies that are part of a group of businesses must use nearly the same fiscal year (differences of up to three months are permitted in some jurisdictions, such as the U.S. and Japan), with consolidating entries to adjust for transactions between units with different fiscal years, so the same resources will not be counted more than once or not at all.

Afghanistan
In Afghanistan, the fiscal year was changed from 21st or 22 March – 20th or 21 March (1 Hamal – 29/30 Hoot) to 21 – 20 December (1 Jadi – 30 Qaws) in 2011. The fiscal year runs with the Afghan or Solar Hijri calendar, because of the differing cycle of leap years in the Gregorian and Afghan calendars, there can be slight differences in the start date of fiscal (and calendar) years. As shown in the chart below, leap years will coincide in 2020 and 2024 but will desynchronize with the Gregorian calendar having a leap year in 2028 as opposed to the Afghan calendar's leap year of 2029.

Correspondence of Solar Hijri and Gregorian calendars (Solar Hijri leap years are marked *)

Australia
In Australia, a fiscal year is commonly called a "financial year" (FY) and starts on 1 July and ends on the next 30 June. Financial years are designated by the calendar year of the second half of the period. For example, financial year  is the 12-month period ending on 30 June  and can be referred to as FY/. It is used for official purposes, by individual taxpayers and by the overwhelming majority of business enterprises. Business enterprises may opt to use a financial year that ends at the end of a week (e.g., 52 or 53 weeks in length, and therefore is not exactly one calendar year in length), or opt for its financial year to end on a date that matches the reporting cycle of its foreign parent. All entities within the one group must use the same financial year.

For government accounting and budget purposes, pre-Federation colonies changed the financial year from the calendar year to a year ending 30 June on the following dates: Victoria changed in 1870, South Australia in 1874, Queensland in 1875, Western Australia in 1892, New South Wales in 1895 and Tasmania in 1904. The Commonwealth adopted the near-ubiquitous financial year standard since its inception in 1901. The reason given for the change was for convenience, as Parliament typically sits during May and June, while it was difficult for it to meet in November and December to pass a budget.

The Financial year is split into the following four-quarters

Austria
In Austria, the fiscal year is the calendar year, 1 January to 31 December.

Bangladesh
In Bangladesh, the fiscal year is 1 July to the next 30 June.

Belarus
In Belarus, the fiscal year is the calendar year, 1 January to 31 December.

Brazil
In Brazil, the fiscal year is the calendar year, 1 January to 31 December.

Bulgaria
In Bulgaria, the fiscal year is the calendar year, 1 January to 31 December, both for personal income tax and for corporate taxes.

Canada
In Canada, the government's financial year is 1 April to 31 March.
(Q1 1 April - 30 June, Q2 1 July - 30 Sept, Q3 1 Oct - 31 Dec and Q4 1 Jan - 31 Mar)

For individual taxpayers, the fiscal year is the calendar year, 1 January to 31 December.

China
In China, the fiscal year for all entities is the calendar year, 1 January to 31 December, and applies to the tax year, statutory year, and planning year.

Colombia
In Colombia, the fiscal year is the calendar year, 1 January to 31 December.

Costa Rica
In Costa Rica, the fiscal year is 1 October to 30 September.

Egypt
In Egypt, the fiscal year is 1 July to 30 June.

France
In France, the fiscal year is the calendar year, 1 January to 31 December, and has been since at least 1911.

Germany
In Germany, the fiscal year runs from 1st January until 31st December.

Greece
In Greece, the fiscal year is the calendar year, 1 January to 31 December.

Hong Kong
In Hong Kong, the government's financial year runs from 1 April to 31 March.

However, a company incorporated in Hong Kong can determine its own financial year-end, which may be different from the government fiscal year.

India
In India, the government's financial year runs from 1 April to 31 March the following year. The financial year from 1 April 2020 to 31 March 2021 would generally be abbreviated as FY 2020-21, but it may also be called FY 2021 on the basis of the ending year. 

Companies following the Indian Depositary Receipt (IDR) are given freedom to choose their financial year. For example, Standard Chartered's IDR follows the UK calendar despite being listed in India. Companies following Indian fiscal year get to know their economic health on 31 March of every Indian financial or fiscal year.

The current fiscal year was adopted by the colonial British government in 1867 to align India's financial year with that of the British Empire. Prior to 1867, India followed a fiscal year that ran from 1 May to 30 April.

In 1984, the LK Jha committee recommended adopting a fiscal year that ran from 1 January to 31 December. However, this proposal was not adopted by the government fearing possible issues during the transition period. A panel set up by the NITI Aayog in July 2016, recommended starting the next fiscal year from 1 January to 31 December after the end of the current five-year plan.

On 4 May 2017, Madhya Pradesh announced that it would move to a January–December financial year, becoming the first Indian state to do so. But later it dropped the idea.

Indonesia
In Indonesia, the fiscal year is the calendar year, 1 January to 31 December.

Iran
In Iran, the fiscal year usually starts on 21st or 22 March (1st of Farvardin in the Solar Hejri calendar) and concludes on next year's 20th or 21 March (29th or 30th of Esfand in the Solar Hijri calendar).

Ireland
In Ireland, the fiscal year is the calendar year, 1 January to 31 December. Until 2001, it was the year ending 5 April, as in the United Kingdom, but was changed with the introduction of the euro. The 2001 tax year was nine months, from April to December.

Israel
In Israel, the fiscal year is the calendar year, 1 January to 31 December.

Italy
In Italy, the fiscal year is the calendar year, 1 January to 31 December. It was changed in 1965, before which it was 1 July to 30 June.

Japan
In Japan, the government's financial year is from 1 April to 31 March. 

Japan's income tax year is 1 January to 31 December, but corporate tax is charged according to the corporation's own annual period.

Lithuania

In Lithuania, the fiscal year is the calendar year, 1 January to 31 December.

Macau
In Macau, the government's financial year is 1 January to 31 December.

Mexico
In Mexico, the fiscal year is the calendar year, 1 January to 31 December.

Moldova
In Moldova, the fiscal year is the calendar year, 1 January to 31 December.

Myanmar/Burma
In Myanmar, the fiscal year is 1 October to 30 September.

Nepal
In Nepal, the fiscal year is July 16 (1 Shrawan in Bikram calendar) to July 15 (31 Ashad in Bikram calendar).

New Zealand
In New Zealand, the government's fiscal and financial reporting year is 1 July to the next 30 June and applies also to the budget. The company and personal financial year is 1 April to 31 March and applies to company and personal income tax.

Pakistan
In Pakistan, the government's fiscal year is 1 July of the previous calendar year and concludes on 30 June. Private companies are free to observe their own accounting year, which may not be the same as government's fiscal year.

Philippines 
In the Philippines, the government's fiscal year is the calendar year, from 1 January to 31 December.

The accounting period for the private sector must follow a 12-month fiscal period which can or can not be synchronized with the calendar year. Most Philippine companies end their fiscal years in December or March.

Poland
In Poland, the fiscal year is the calendar year, from 1 January to 31 December.

Portugal
In Portugal, the fiscal year is the calendar year, 1 January to 31 December.

Qatar
In Qatar, the fiscal year is from 1 January to 31 December.

Romania
In Romania, the fiscal year is the calendar year, 1 January to 31 December.

Russia
In Russia, the fiscal year is the calendar year, 1 January to 31 December.

Singapore
In Singapore, the fiscal year for the calculation of personal income taxes is 1 January to 31 December.

The fiscal year for the Government of Singapore and many government-linked corporations is 1 April to 31 March.

Corporations and organisations are permitted to select any date as the end of each fiscal year, as long as this date remains constant. However, new companies should consciously choose their financial year end to stretch as much as a duration of 12 months as possible.

South Africa
In South Africa, the financial year for the Government of South Africa is 1 April to 31 March.

The year of assessment for individuals covers twelve months, 1 March to the final day of February the following year. The Act also provides for certain classes of taxpayers to have a year of assessment ending on a day other than the last day of February. Companies are permitted to have a tax year ending on a date that coincides with their financial year. Many older companies still use a tax year that runs from 1 July to 30 June, inherited from the British system. A common practice for newer companies is to run their tax year from 1 March to the final day of February following, to synchronize with the tax year for individuals.

South Korea
In South Korea, the fiscal year is the calendar year, 1 January to 31 December.

Spain
In Spain, the fiscal year is the calendar year, 1 January to 31 December.

Sweden
In Sweden, the fiscal year for individuals is the calendar year, 1 January to 31 December.

The fiscal year for an organisation is typically one of the following:
1 January to 31 December
1 May to 30 April
1 July to 30 June
1 September to 31 August

However, all calendar months are allowed. If an organisation wishes to change into a non-calendar year, permission from the Tax Authority is required.

Switzerland 
In Switzerland, the fiscal year is the calendar year, 1 January to 31 December.

Taiwan
In Taiwan, the fiscal year is the calendar year, 1 January to 31 December. However, an enterprise may elect to adopt a special fiscal year at the time it is established and can request approval from the tax authorities to change its fiscal year.

Thailand
In Thailand, the government's fiscal year (FY) is 1 October to 30 September of the following year. For individual taxpayers it is the calendar year, 1 January to 31 December.

Turkey
In Turkey, the fiscal year is the calendar year, 1 January to 31 December.

Ukraine
In Ukraine, the fiscal year is the calendar year, 1 January to 31 December.

United Arab Emirates
In the United Arab Emirates, the fiscal year is the calendar year, 1 January to 31 December.

United Kingdom
In the United Kingdom, the financial year runs from 1 April to 31 March for the purposes of government financial statements. For personal tax purposes the fiscal year starts on 6 April and ends on 5 April of the next calendar year.
	
Although United Kingdom corporation tax is charged by reference to the government's financial year, companies can adopt any year as their accounting year: if there is a change in tax rate, the taxable profit is apportioned to financial years on a time basis.

A number of major corporations that were once government-owned, such as BT Group and the National Grid, continue to use the government's financial year, which ends on the last day of March, as they have found no reason to change since privatisation.
	
The 5 April year end for income tax reflects the old civil and ecclesiastical calendar under which New Year began on 25 March (Lady Day). The difference between the two dates is accounted for by the eleven days omitted in September 1752 due to the Calendar (New Style) Act 1750 by which Great Britain also converted from the Julian Calendar to the Gregorian Calendar. However, although the calendar year finished on 24 March, the tax year finished a day later, on 25 March, the Quarter Day.

For a fuller explanation about the history of the United Kingdom income tax year and its start date, see History of taxation in the United Kingdom#Why the United Kingdom income tax year begins on 6 April.

United States

Federal government

In the United States, the federal government's fiscal year is the 12-month period beginning 1 October and ending 30 September the following year.

Until 1976, the fiscal year began on 1 July and ended on 30 June. The Congressional Budget and Impoundment Control Act of 1974 made the change to allow Congress more time to arrive at a budget each year, and provided for what is known as the "transitional quarter" from 1 July 1976 to 30 September 1976. An earlier shift in the federal government's fiscal year was made in 1843, shifting the fiscal year from a calendar year to one starting on 1 July.

For example, the United States government Fiscal Year  is:

 1st quarter: 1 October  – 31 December 
 2nd quarter: 1 January  – 31 March 
 3rd quarter: 1 April  – 30 June 
 4th quarter: 1 July  – 30 September

State governments
State governments set their own fiscal year. Forty-six of the fifty states set their fiscal year to end on 30 June. Four states have fiscal years that end on a different date:

 Alabama, ends 30 September
 Michigan, ends 30 September
 New York, ends 31 March
 Texas, ends 31 August

The fiscal year for the Washington, D.C., government ends on 30 September.

Among the inhabited territories of the United States, most align with the federal fiscal year, ending on 30 September. These include American Samoa, Guam, the Northern Mariana Islands and the U.S. Virgin Islands. Puerto Rico is the exception, with its fiscal year ending on 30 June.

Vietnam
In Vietnam, the fiscal year is the calendar year, 1 January to 31 December.

Businesses and organizations
The tax year for a business is governed by the fiscal year it chooses.  A business may choose any consistent fiscal year that it wants; however, for seasonal businesses such as farming and retail, a good account practice is to end the fiscal year shortly after the highest revenue time of year.  Consequently, most large agriculture companies end their fiscal years after the harvest season, and most retailers end their fiscal years shortly after the Christmas shopping season.

See also
 4–4–5 calendar

References

Further reading
 
 

Financial accounting
Types of year